The Sixtieth Amendment of the Constitution of India, officially known as The Constitution (Sixtieth Amendment) Act, 1988, amended article 276 of the Constitution relating to taxes on professions, trades, callings and employments. The 60th Amendment also omitted the proviso to clause (2) of article 276.

Text

The full text of clause(2) of Article 276 of the Constitution, after the 60th Amendment, is given below:

Proposal and enactment
The Constitution (Sixtieth Amendment) Bill, 1988 (Bill No. 100 of 1988) was introduced in the Lok Sabha on 22 August 1988. It was introduced by Ajit Kumar Panja, then Minister of State in the Department of Revenue in the Ministry of Finance. The Bill sought to amend sought to amend article 276 of the Constitution relating to taxes on professions, trades, callings and employments. Section 2 of the bill amended Clause (2) of article 276 of the Constitution has to increase the ceiling of tax on professions, trades, callings and employments from 250 per person per annum to 2500 per person per annum. It also sought to omit the proviso to clause (2) of article 276. The full text of the Statement of Objects and Reasons appended to the bill is given below:

The Bill was considered by the Lok Sabha on 30 November 1988 and passed on the same day in the original form. The Bill, as passed by the Lok Sabha, was debated by the Rajya Sabha on 5 and 6 December and passed by that House on 6 December 1988. The bill received assent from then President Ramaswamy Venkataraman on 20 December 1988. It was notified in The Gazette of India, and came into effect on the same date.

See also
List of amendments of the Constitution of India

References

60
1988 in India
1988 in law
Rajiv Gandhi administration